AHHS may refer to:
 Abington Heights High School, Clarks Summit, Pennsylvania, United States
 Alamo Heights High School, Alamo Heights, Texas, United States
 Alexander Hamilton Historical Society
 Alexander Hamilton Jr./Sr. High School, Elmsford, New York, United States
 Andrew Hill High School, San Jose, California, United States
 Arlington Heights High School, Fort Worth, Texas, United States